Orzotto is an Italian dish similar to risotto, but made with pearl barley instead of rice. Orzotti are a speciality of the Friuli Venezia Giulia region of northeastern Italy.

The name is a portmanteau of orzo (the Italian word for barley) and risotto. This should not be confused with orzo, otherwise known as risoni, a type of wheat pasta formed into shapes resembling barley grains.

References

Italian cuisine
Friuli-Venezia Giulia
Barley-based dishes